Helge Frans Birger ”Heguli” Herala (30 September 1922  − 27 February 2010) was a Finnish theatre and film actor. He appeared in several films and was also known for his popular television appearances.

Selected filmography

Hallin Janne (1950)
Noita palaa elämään (1952)
Mother or Woman (1953)
1918 – mies ja hänen omatuntonsa (1957)
Kultainen vasikka (1961)
Tähdet kertovat, komisario Palmu (1962)
Täällä Pohjantähden alla (1968)
Äl’ yli päästä perhanaa (1968)
Akseli and Elina (1970)
Aika hyvä ihmiseksi (1977)
Pölhölä (1981)
Uuno Turhapuro muuttaa maalle (1986)
Raid (2003)
Uuno Turhapuro – This Is My Life (2004)

References

External links 
 

1922 births
2010 deaths
Finnish amputees
People from Hämeenlinna
Finnish male film actors
20th-century Finnish male actors
21st-century Finnish male actors
Finnish military personnel of World War II